Ivo Rafael Brandão Afonso (born 17 December 1975) is a Portuguese retired professional footballer who played as a central defender.

Club career
Born in Porto, Afonso played four consecutive seasons in the Primeira Liga with Gil Vicente FC, where he appeared mostly as a backup (an average of 14 games per campaign).

At nearly 31 he moved abroad, representing teams in Cyprus, Greece and Luxembourg. His only spell in these countries' top flight was with Olympiakos Nicosia, in 2006–07.

References

External links

1975 births
Living people
Footballers from Porto
Portuguese footballers
Association football defenders
Primeira Liga players
Liga Portugal 2 players
Segunda Divisão players
Boavista F.C. players
F.C. Famalicão players
F.C. Marco players
Gil Vicente F.C. players
Associação Naval 1º de Maio players
Moreirense F.C. players
Cypriot First Division players
Cypriot Second Division players
Olympiakos Nicosia players
Football League (Greece) players
Panetolikos F.C. players
Kalamata F.C. players
Apollon Pontou FC players
CS Oberkorn players
Portuguese expatriate footballers
Expatriate footballers in Cyprus
Expatriate footballers in Greece
Expatriate footballers in Luxembourg
Portuguese expatriate sportspeople in Cyprus
Portuguese expatriate sportspeople in Greece